Aphyxion is a heavy metal band from Denmark formed in 2007 in Ribe The group has released three albums: Earth Entangled in 2014, Aftermath in 2016 and Void in 2019. They played at Wacken Open Air in Germany as the youngest band to ever do so. They were recognized by Metal Hammer UK to be "The saviours of melodic death metal" and "one of the most exciting bands in Europe". On September 2, 2017, they opened for Metallica at the Royal Arena in Copenhagen, Denmark. The show was part of Metallica's WorldWired Tour.

Members 
Current lineup:

 Jakob Jensen - drums
 Jesper Haas - rhythm guitar
 Michael Vahl - vocals
 Jais Jessen - bass
 Jonas Haagensen - lead guitar

Past members:

 Bastian - drums
 Mads Jepsen - vocals
 Bertil Rytter - rhythm guitar, backing vocals

Discography 
 Earth Entangled (2014)
 Aftermath (2016)
 Void (2019)
 Ad Astra (2023)

References

External links 
 Facebook
 Official website
 Bandcamp

Musical groups established in 2007
Danish melodic death metal musical groups